Johannes Browallius (30 August 1707 – 25 July 1755), also called John Browall, was a Finnish and Swedish Lutheran theologian, physicist, botanist and at one time  friend of Swedish taxonomist Carl Linnaeus.

Career
He was a Professor of Physics from 1737–46, Professor of Theology 1746–49 and was the Bishop of Turku, then a diocese of the Church of Sweden, and Vice-Chancellor of The Royal Academy of Turku from 1749 until his death in 1755.

He was an elected a member of the Royal Swedish Academy of Sciences in 1740.

Botanical activities
In 1735 seeds of a plant collected in Panama by Robert Millar were donated to Philip Miller of the Chelsea Physic Garden in London. The plants were grown on and forwarded to the Royal Society but with the name Dalea. This plant was named Browallia (Species Plantarum 2: 631. 1753 [1 May 1753]; Genera Plantarum ed. 5, 1754) by the famous plant taxonomist  Carl Linnaeus in honour of his fellow countryman and botanical colleague. Linnaeus’s principles of botanical nomenclature were first expounded in Fundamenta Botanica of 1736 and these were later elaborated, with numerous examples, in his Critica Botanica   of 1737. The book was published in Germany when Linnaeus was 29 and the title page carries a discursus by Johannes Browall. The friendship was not to last. Coombes notes "Browallia demissa (weak). Renamed by Linnaeus from B. elata (tall) after falling out with Browall."

Browall had advised the young Linnaeus to finish his studies abroad, then marry a rich girl – even though he was already engaged to Sara Lisa Moraea. Linnaeus did, indeed, spend the winter of 1737–1738 in Leiden, travelling on to France. While abroad, he was sent news that "his best friend B." had taken advantage of his absence to court Sara Lisa Moraea and had almost succeeded in persuading her that her fiance would never return to Sweden. However, the bishop’s suit failed; Sara Lisa and Linnaeus were married in 1739. The entry under Browallia grandiflora in Curtis’s Botanical Magazine of 1831 reports:

Publications

See also
List of Bishops of Turku

References

External links

1707 births
1755 deaths
18th-century Finnish physicists
18th-century Latin-language writers
18th-century male writers
Finnish Lutheran theologians
18th-century Swedish physicists
Botanists active in Europe
18th-century Finnish botanists
18th-century Swedish botanists
Swedish taxonomists
18th-century Lutheran bishops
Lutheran archbishops and bishops of Turku
Members of the Royal Swedish Academy of Sciences
18th-century Protestant theologians